Anchignathodontidae is an extinct conodont family.

Genera
Genera are,
 †Anchignathodus
 †Diplognathodus
 †Hindeodus
 †Pseudohindeodus

References

External links 

 Anchignathodontidae at fossilworks.org (retrieved 30 April 2016)

Ozarkodinida families